Ophichthus ishiyamorum is an eel in the family Ophichthidae (worm/snake eels). It was described by John E. McCosker in 2010. It is a marine, deep water-dwelling eel which is known from the Gulf of Aden and Somalia.

The species epithet "ishiyamorum" referred to Nelson and Patsy Ishiyama.

References

ishiyamorum
Taxa named by John E. McCosker
Fish described in 2010